Soraya Marisel Martínez Ferrada  (born 1972) is a Chilean-Canadian Liberal politician who was elected as a Member of Parliament in the House of Commons of Canada to represent the federal riding Hochelaga during the 2019 Canadian federal election.

Early life 
Martínez Ferrada was born on 28 August 1972 in Santiago de Chile, province of Santiago, Chile, to Omar Martínez Prieto and Maritza Inés Ferrada Videla.

Career 
Prior to her election in the House of Commons, she served as a city councillor for the Montreal City Council in the municipal electoral district of Saint-Michel as a member first of Union Montréal (2005 to 2007) and then of Vision Montreal from 2007 to 2009, when she lost to Union Montreal candidate (now Quebec Liberal Party MNA for Viau), Frantz Benjamin.

She worked as a Parliament Hill staffer. She gained her seat from the New Democratic Party, by a tight margin over the Bloc Québécois.

After her election to Parliament, Martínez Ferrada was appointed as Parliamentary Secretary to the Minister of Immigration, Refugees and Citizenship, Marco Mendicino.

Personal life 
Martínez Ferrada moved to Canada in 1980, and lived in the East End of Montreal.

Electoral Results

References

External links

Living people
1972 births
Liberal Party of Canada MPs
Members of the House of Commons of Canada from Quebec
Montreal city councillors
Women members of the House of Commons of Canada
21st-century Canadian women politicians
Chilean emigrants to Canada
People from Santiago